The following is a list of school districts in Indiana.

Adams County

 Adams Central Community Schools 
 North Adams Community Schools 
 South Adams Schools

Allen County

 East Allen County Schools 
 Fort Wayne Community Schools
 Northwest Allen County Schools 
 Southwest Allen County Schools

Bartholomew County

 Bartholomew Consolidated School Corporation
 Flat Rock-Hawcreek School Corporation

Boone County

 Lebanon Community School Corporation 
 Western Boone County Community School Dist 
 Zionsville Community Schools

Carroll County

 Carroll Consolidated School Corporation
 Delphi Community School Corporation

Cass County

 Lewis Cass Schools
 Logansport Community School Corporation 
 Pioneer Regional School Corporation

Clark County

 Clarksville Community School Corporation
 Greater Clark County Schools 
 West Clark Community Schools

Clinton County

 Clinton Central School Corporation
 Clinton Prairie School Corporation
 Community Schools of Frankfort
 Rossville Consolidated School District

Daviess County

 Barr-Reeve Community Schools
 North Daviess Community Schools 
 Washington Community Schools

Dearborn County

 Lawrenceburg Community School Corporation 
 South Dearborn Community School Corporation 
 Sunman-Dearborn Community School Corporation

Decatur County

 Decatur County Community Schools 
 Greensburg Community Schools

DeKalb County

 DeKalb County Central United School District 
 DeKalb County Eastern Community School District 
 Garrett-Keyser-Butler Community School District
 Hamilton Community Schools

Delaware County

Laboratory

 Burris Laboratory School
 Indiana Academy for Science, Mathematics, and Humanities

Public

 Cowan Community School Corporation
 Daleville Community Schools 
 Delaware Community School Corporation 
 Liberty-Perry Community School Corporation 
 Muncie Community Schools 
 Wes-Del Community Schools Corporation
 Yorktown Community Schools

Dubois County

 Greater Jasper Consolidated Schools 
 Northeast Dubois County School Corporation 
 Southeast Dubois County School Corporation
 Southwest Dubois County School Corporation

Elkhart County

 Baugo Community Schools
 Concord Community Schools
 Elkhart Community Schools 
 Fairfield Community Schools 
 Goshen Community Schools 
 Middlebury Community Schools 
 Wa-Nee Community Schools

Fountain County

 Attica Consolidated School Corporation
 Covington Community School Corporation
 Southeast Fountain School Corporation

Franklin County

 Batesville Community School Corporation
 Franklin County Community School Corporation

Fulton County

 Caston School Corporation
 Rochester Community School Corporation

Gibson County

 East Gibson School Corporation 
 North Gibson School Corporation 
 South Gibson School Corporation

Grant County

 Eastbrook Community School Corporation 
 Madison-Grant United School Corporation 
 Marion Community Schools 
 Mississinewa Community School Corporation 
 Oak Hill United School Corporation

Greene County

 Bloomfield School District
 Eastern Greene Schools 
 Linton-Stockton School Corporation 
 Metropolitan School District of Shakamak Schools 
 White River Valley School District

Hamilton County

 Carmel Clay Schools
 Hamilton Heights School Corporation 
 Hamilton Southeastern Schools 
 Noblesville Schools 
 Sheridan Community Schools
 Westfield Washington Schools

Hancock County

 Eastern Hancock County Community School Corporation 
 Greenfield-Central Community Schools 
 Mount Vernon Community School Corporation 
 Southern Hancock County Community School Corporation

Harrison County

 Lanesville Community School Corporation
 North Harrison Community School Corporation  
 South Harrison Community Schools

Hendricks County

 Avon Community School Corporation
 Brownsburg Community School Corporation
 Danville Community School Corporation 
 Mill Creek Community School Corporation 
 North West Hendricks Schools 
 Plainfield Community School Corporation

Henry County

 Blue River Valley Schools
 C.A. Beard Memorial School Corporation
 New Castle Community School Corporation 
 Shenandoah School Corporation 
 South Henry School Corporation

Howard County

 Eastern Howard School Corporation 
 Kokomo-Center Township Consolidated School Corporation 
 Northwestern School Corporation
 Taylor Community School Corporation 
 Western School Corporation

Jackson County

 Brownstown Central Community School Corporation
 Crothersville Community Schools
 Medora Community School Corporation 
 Seymour Community Schools

Jasper County

 Kankakee Valley School Corporation 
 Rensselaer Central School Corporation

Jefferson County

 Madison Consolidated Schools 
 Southwestern Jefferson County Consolidated Schools

Johnson County

 Center Grove Community School Corporation
 Central Nine Career Center
 Clark-Pleasant Community School Corporation
 Edinburgh Community School Corporation 
 Franklin Community School Corporation 
 Greenwood Community School Corporation 
 Nineveh-Hensley-Jackson United School Corporation

Knox County

 North Knox School Corporation 
 South Knox School Corporation 
 Twin Rivers Career Education Area
 Vincennes Community School Corporation

Kosciusko County

 Tippecanoe Valley School Corporation 
 Warsaw Community Schools 
 Wawasee Community School Corporation

LaGrange County

 Lakeland School Corporation 
 Prairie Heights Community School Corporation 
 Westview School Corporation

Lake County

 Crown Point Community School Corporation
 Gary Community School Corporation 
 Griffith Public Schools 
 Hanover Community School Corporation 
 Lake Central School Corporation 
 Lake Ridge Schools Corporation 
 Lake Station Community Schools 
 Merrillville Community School Corporation 
 River Forest Community School Corporation 
 School City of East Chicago 
 School City of Hammond 
 School City of Hobart 
 School City of Whiting 
 School Town of Highland 
 School Town of Munster 
 Tri-Creek School Corporation

LaPorte County

 LaPorte Community School Corporation 
 Metropolitan School District of New Durham Township 
 Michigan City Area Schools 
 New Prairie United School Corporation 
 South Central Community School Corporation 
 Tri-Township Consolidated School Corporation

Lawrence County

 Mitchell Community Schools 
 North Lawrence Community Schools

Madison County

 Alexandria Community School Corporation
 Anderson Community School Corporation
 Elwood Community School Corporation 
 Frankton-Lapel Community Schools 
 South Madison Community School Corporation

Marion County

 Beech Grove City Schools
 Franklin Township Community School Corporation 
 Indianapolis Public Schools 
 Irvington Community School
 Metropolitan School District of Decatur Township 
 Metropolitan School District of Lawrence Township 
 Metropolitan School District of Perry Township 
 Metropolitan School District of Pike Township 
 Metropolitan School District of Warren Township 
 Metropolitan School District of Washington Township 
 Metropolitan School District of Wayne Township 
 Perry Township Schools 
 School Town of Speedway

Marshall County

 Argos Community Schools
 Bremen Public Schools
 Culver Community School Corporation
 Plymouth Community School Corporation 
 Triton School Corporation

Martin County

 Loogootee Community School Corporation 
 Shoals Community School Corporation

Miami County

 Maconaquah School Corporation 
 North Miami Community Schools 
 Peru Community Schools

Monroe County

 Monroe County Community School Corporation 
 Richland-Bean Blossom Community School Corporation

Montgomery County

 Crawfordsville Community Schools
 North Montgomery Community School Corporation 
 South Montgomery Community School Corporation

Morgan County

 Eminence Community School Corporation 
 Metropolitan School District of Martinsville 
 Monroe-Gregg School District 
 Mooresville Consolidated School Corporation

Newton County

 North Newton School Corporation 
 South Newton School Corporation

Noble County

 Central Noble Community School Corporation
 East Noble School Corporation 
 West Noble School Corporation

Orange County

 Lost River Career Cooperative
 Orleans Community Schools 
 Paoli Community School Corporation 
 Springs Valley Community School Corporation

Parke County

 North Central Parke Community School Corporation
 Southwest Parke Community School Corporation

Perry County

 Cannelton City Schools
 Perry Central Community School Corporation
 Tell City-Troy Township School Corporation

Porter County

 Duneland School Corporation
 East Porter County School Corporation 
 Metropolitan School District of Boone Township 
 Portage Township Schools 
 Porter Township School Corporation 
 Union Township School Corporation 
 Valparaiso Community Schools

Posey County

 Metropolitan School District of Mount Vernon and South Posey County Schools 
 Metropolitan School District of North Posey County Schools

Pulaski County

 Eastern Pulaski Community School Corporation 
 West Central School Corporation

Putnam County

 Area 30 Career Center
 Cloverdale Community Schools
 Greencastle Community School Corporation 
 North Putnam Community Schools
 South Putnam Community Schools

Randolph County

 Monroe Central School Corporation 
 Randolph Central School Corporation 
 Randolph Eastern School Corporation 
 Randolph Southern School Corporation 
 Union School Corporation

Ripley County

 Jac-Cen-Del Community School Corporation 
 Milan Community Schools 
 South Ripley Community School Corporation 
 Southeastern Career Center

St. Joseph County

 John Glenn School Corporation
 Penn-Harris-Madison School Corporation 
 School City of Mishawaka 
 South Bend Community School Corporation 
 Union-North United Schools

Scott County

 Scott County School District 1 
 Scott County School District 2

Shelby County

 Blue River Career Programs
 Northwestern Consolidated School Corporation 
 Shelby Eastern Schools 
 Shelbyville Central Schools 
 Southwestern Consolidated School District of Shelby County

Spencer County

 North Spencer County School Corporation 
 South Spencer County School Corporation

Starke County

 Knox Community School Corporation 
 North Judson-San Pierre School Corporation 
 Oregon-Davis School Corporation

Steuben County

 Fremont Community Schools 
 Metropolitan School District of Steuben County

Sullivan County

 Dugger Union School Corporation
 Northeast School Corporation of Sullivan County  
 Southwest School Corporation of Sullivan County

Tippecanoe County

 Lafayette School Corporation
 Tippecanoe School Corporation  
 West Lafayette Community School Corporation

Tipton County

 Tipton Community School Corporation 
 Tri-Central Community Schools Corporation

Vermillion County

 North Vermillion Community School Corporation 
 South Vermillion Community School Corporation

Wabash County

 Heartland Career Center
 Manchester Community Schools 
 Metropolitan School District of Wabash County Schools 
 Wabash City Schools

Washington County

 East Washington School Corporation 
 Salem Community Schools 
 West Washington School Corporation

Wayne County

 Centerville-Abington Community Schools
 Nettle Creek School Corporation 
 Northeastern Wayne Schools 
 Richmond Community Schools 
 Western Wayne Schools

Wells County

 Metropolitan School District of Bluffton-Harrison 
 Northern Wells Community Schools 
 Southern Wells Community Schools

White County

 Frontier School Corporation 
 North White School Corporation 
 Tri-County School Corporation 
 Twin Lakes School Corporation

Whitley County

 Smith-Green Community Schools 
 Whitko Community School Corporation  
 Whitley County Consolidated Schools

Single-District Counties

 Benton Community School Corporation
 Blackford County Schools
 Brown County School Corporation
 Clay Community Schools
 Crawford County Community School Corporation
 Evansville Vanderburgh School Corporation  (Vanderburgh County)
 Fayette County School Corporation
 New Albany-Floyd County Consolidated School Corporation (Floyd County) 
 Huntington County Community School Corporation 
 Jay School Corporation 
 Jennings County Schools 
 Pike County School Corporation 
 Rising Sun-Ohio County Community School Corporation 
 Rush County Schools
 Spencer-Owen Community Schools (Owen County)
 Switzerland County School Corporation 
 Union County/College Corner Joint School District 
 Vigo County School Corporation 
 Metropolitan School District of Warren County 
 Warrick County School Corporation

See also
Indiana Department of Education
List of high schools in Indiana

External links
Indiana Department of Education
Indiana K-12 web sites
Indiana school data
Indiana School Directory

 
School districts
Indiana
School districts